The Hôtel des Alpes-Grand Hôtel or Résidence des Alpes is an assemblage of buildings which formed a former palace in the city of Montreux in Switzerland

History
In 1840 the town bought a parcel of land on which to build a hostel entitled 'Chasseur des Alpes'. Over the following years this hostel was enlarged three times to become - in 1855 - the hôtel des Alpes. The main building was designed by Henri Chessex, son of the owner and brother of Ami Chessex. The opening of the Hôtel led to a tourist boom and in 1861 a railway line was opened between Montreux and Villeneuve, calling at Territet. In 1875 a dining hall was added to the building and two years later Ami Chessex chose the architect Louis Maillard (later joined by Eugène Jost) to build the Grand Hôtel beside the hôtel des Alpes. The decor was by Marcel de  Chollet. The two buildings were linked by a corridor and soon formed a single structure.

Among the Hôtel's many notable guests were Elisabeth of Bavaria, who visited four times, and Francis Joseph I of Austria in 1893. The Hôtel built on this success, housing the first telephone in Switzerland. In 1971, Deep Purple temporarily converted one of its corridors to a live room in order to record Machine Head after a flare gun incident set their intended venue, Montreux Casino, on fire. In 1975 it closed and its main hall and dining hall were turned into a theatre, whilst the Grand Hôtel's bedrooms became the National Swiss Audiovisual Museum, though this closed in 2008 and left the premises in 2012 to allow for their renovation. The two buildings are classed as cultural monuments. It suffered fires on 29 January 1984 and 28 September 2012.

Bibliography (in French) 
 Grand Hôtel et Hôtel des Alpes Territet. Suisse, 1900
 Gilbert de Montmollin, Le Grand-Hôtel et Hôtel des Alpes de Territet, Audiorama Musée suisse de l'audio-visuel, 1994
 Dave Lüthi, Le Grand Hôtel et Hôtel des Alpes, Territet: rapport historique et architectural, Service des monuments historiques, 1996
 Dave Lüthi, Le Grand-Hôtel et Hôtel des Alpes à Territet (1840-1975): Reflet du développement de Montreux au XIXe siècle : Historique et description, Musée du Vieux-Montreux, 1998

References 

Buildings and structures in the canton of Vaud
Cultural property of national significance in the canton of Vaud